Isostar is a sports drink sold in Europe. It is similar to Gatorade and Powerade in that it hydrates and provides energy through glucose. Isostar was first created in Switzerland in 1977.

Products 

Isostar is sold in many different varieties. The basic drink variety is generally sold in local shops and gymnasium vending machines. Also sold are "Power Tabs", a tablet form of the drink. In addition to this, powdered versions of the drink are sold, usually to be dissolved in water. Power bars and Protein bars are also sold under the Isostar brand.

Ingredients 

Water, carbohydrates (sucrose, glucose syrup dehydrated DE47, maltodextrin DE19), acidity regulator: citric acid, sodium citrate, natural flavoring, calcium phosphate, magnesium carbonate, sodium chloride, potassium chloride, antioxidant: ascorbic acid, emulsifier: modified corn starch, coconut oil, vitamin B1.

References

External links 

 Isostar.com

Sports drinks
Products introduced in 1977